Khleber Miller Van Zandt (November 7, 1836 – March 19, 1930) was a Texas business executive, military officer, and politician.

Early life
Van Zandt was born on November 7, 1836. His father was Isaac Van Zandt.

Van Zandt attended Franklin College in Tennessee.

Career
During the American Civil War of 1861-1865, Van Zandt served in the Confederate States Army. After the war, he was the commander of the trans-Mississippi division of the United Confederate Veterans.

Van Zandt settled in Fort Worth in 1865, and operated a dry-goods business and later became president of both a construction company and a bank, the Fort Worth National Bank.

Van Zandt was a Democrat, and was elected to the  Thirteenth Texas Legislature, 1873–74.

Van Zandt has the prime mover of the founding of Confederate Park in Lakeside, Tarrant County, Texas.

Death
Van Zandt died on March 19, 1930, in Fort Worth, Texas.

References 

Dallas Morning News, March 20, 1930, cited in The Handbook of Texas Online.
Frank W. Johnson, A History of Texas and Texans (5 vols., ed. E. C. Barker and E. W. Winkler [Chicago and New York: American Historical Society, 1914; reprinted 1916]), cited in The Handbook of Texas Online. 
Khleber M. Van Zandt, Force Without Fanfare; The Autobiography of K. M. Van Zandt, ed. Sandra L. Myres (Fort Worth: Texas Christian University Press, 1968?) , cited in The Handbook of Texas Online.

1836 births
1930 deaths
People from Franklin County, Tennessee
People from Fort Worth, Texas
Texas lawyers
Members of the Texas House of Representatives
Confederate States Army officers
Military personnel from Texas